Adisura bella is a species of moth of the family Noctuidae first described by Max Gaede in 1915. It is found in Africa, including South Africa, Somalia, Tanzania and Saudi Arabia

References

Heliothinae
Moths described in 1915
Fauna of Somalia
Insects of Tanzania
Moths of Africa